Lost in the Dark (Italian:Sperduti nel buio) is a 1901 play by the Italian writer Roberto Bracco. It has been turned into films twice: the 1914 silent Lost in the Dark, considered by some a precursor to Italian neorealism, and Lost in the Dark (1947).

References

Bibliography
 Goble, Alan. The Complete Index to Literary Sources in Film. Walter de Gruyter, 1999.

Italian plays adapted into films
Plays set in Italy
Plays by Roberto Bracco
1901 plays